Kamanor is a surname. Notable people with the surname include:

 Mohamed Kamanor (born 1992), Sierra Leonean footballer
 Sia Kamanor (born 1977), Sierra Leonean sprinter